Time Flies is the tenth studio album from American country music singer John Michael Montgomery. It was released October 14, 2008 on his own label, Stringtown Records, as his first studio album since Letters from Home four years previous. Three singles have been released from it. The first two, "Mad Cowboy Disease" and "If You Ever Went Away", both failed to chart on the Billboard Hot Country Songs charts. "Forever", the third single, became his first Top 40 country hit since "Letters from Home" in 2004, peaking at number 28.

Track listing

Personnel
 Bruce Bouton - steel guitar
 Mike Brignardello - bass guitar
 Pat Buchanan - electric guitar
 Marty Dillingham - drums
 Dan Dugmore - dobro, steel guitar
 Stuart Duncan - fiddle, mandolin
 Kimo Forrest - baritone guitar, electric guitar, background vocals
 Shannon Forrest - drums, percussion
 Byron Gallimore - electric guitar, synthesizer
 Tony Harrell - piano, synthesizer, Wurlitzer
 Wes Hightower - background vocals
 Brent Mason - electric guitar
 John Michael Montgomery - acoustic guitar, lead vocals
 Steve Stokes - fiddle
 Bryan Sutton - acoustic guitar
 Russell Terrell - background vocals
 Rusty VanSickle - background vocals
 Tim Williams - bass guitar
 Glenn Worf - bass guitar

Chart performance

Album

Singles

References

2008 albums
John Michael Montgomery albums
Albums produced by Byron Gallimore